Synaphe glaisalis is a species of moth of the family Pyralidae. It was described by Daniel Lucas in 1933. It is found in Morocco.

References

Moths described in 1933
Pyralini
Endemic fauna of Morocco
Moths of Africa